Nantucket V is the fifth release and last studio album by North Carolina music group, Nantucket. A less hard rock sounding work produced through Raleigh, North Carolina label Executive Records (now defunct), it features the songs "Pretty Legs" and "Looking You Up". Nantucket V was made available on compact disc through re-issue label Retrospect Records in 2007.

Track listing
Pretty Legs (Redd/Blair/Johnson) – 3:34
Ain't It a Shame (Redd) – 3:21
Made for You (Thornton) – 4:02
Looking You Up (Redd/Downing) – 3:59
Drivin' Me Crazy (Johnson/Uzzell/Redd) - 3:21
Out of Control (Johnson/Gates) - 1:05
Can't Stop Rockin' (Redd) - 3:00
Horizontal Weekend (Redd) - 3:11
Freedom (Thornton) - 3:49
Party'n in the Cars (Redd/Thornton/Johnson/Gates) - 3:37

Personnel
 Larry Uzzell: Lead & Background Vocals, Harmonica, Percussion
 Tommy Redd: Rhythm Guitar, Background Vocals
 Eddie Blair: Saxophones, Keyboards, Background Vocals
 David "Thumbs" Johnson: Bass Guitar, Oberheim DX Drum Machine, Background Vocals
 Richard Gates: Drums, Percussion, Oberheim DX Drum Machine, Simmons Drums
 Alan Thornton: Lead & Rhythm Guitar, Z-28

References
 Nantucket - A Band Of Desperate Men. Nantucket: Credits. Retrieved Apr. 21, 2007.
 The Daily Reflector. Nantucket: Credits. Retrieved Apr. 21, 2007.
 MusicMight. Nantucket: Credits. Retrieved Apr. 21, 2007.

External links
 [ Nantucket on Allmusic]
 Unofficial Nantucket Fansite
 Nantucket on MySpace

1984 albums
Nantucket (band) albums